Immortal Love  Bitter Spirit is a 1961 Japanese drama film written and directed by Keisuke Kinoshita. It was nominated for the Academy Award for Best Foreign Language Film. Masakazu Tamura made his official debut in the film.

Plot
Over a time span of 30 years, the film tells the story of Sadako, who is pressured into a marriage with Heibei, the crippled war veteran son of the local landlord, although she loves Takashi, a young man from the same village. Takashi later marries Tomoko, but neither he nor Sadako can forget their past mutual affection.

Cast 
Hideko Takamine as Sadako
Keiji Sada as Takashi
Tatsuya Nakadai as Heibei
Nobuko Otowa as Tomoko, Takashi's wife
Akira Ishihama as Yutaka, Takashi's son
Yukiko Fuji as Naoko, Sadako's daughter
Kiyoshi Nonomura as Rikizo, Takashi's brother
Yoshi Katō as Sojiro, Sadako's father
Yasushi Nagata as Heizaemon, Heibei's father
Torahiko Hamada as Mr. Koshinuma
Masakazu Tamura as Eiichi, Sadako's son
Masaya Totsuka as Morito, Sadako's son
Eijirō Tōno as Policeman

References

External links

1961 films
1961 drama films
Japanese drama films
1960s Japanese-language films
Japanese black-and-white films
Shochiku films
Films directed by Keisuke Kinoshita
Films with screenplays by Keisuke Kinoshita
1960s Japanese films